Wanli (2 February 1573 – 27 August 1620; Qing dynasty avoided the naming taboo of the Qianlong Emperor, Hongli 弘曆, and wrote 曆 as 歷, 厯, 厤) was the era name of the Wanli Emperor, the 14th emperor of Ming dynasty of China. The Ming dynasty used this era name for a total of 48 years, which was the longest used era name by the Ming dynasty.

In the early Wanli period, Zhang Juzheng led the implementation of a series of reform measures; the economy and society continued to develop; the foreign military also won successive victories; and the imperial court showed a restoration atmosphere. It was known in historiography as the "Wanli Restoration" (萬曆中興). Later, due to the succession dispute (國本之爭), the Wanli Emperor was prevented by his ministers from making his beloved son the crown prince, and he was so angry that he did not go to court for thirty years. It was known in historiography as the "Wanli's negligence" (萬曆怠政). During this period, the Wanli Emperor allowed the court officials to fight against each other, and the Donglin factional strife (東林黨爭) emerged; they used the Three Cases of the late Ming dynasty (明末三案) to fight each other, which eventually led to the fall of the Ming dynasty.

On 28 August 1620 (Wanli 48, 1st day of the 8th month), the Taichang Emperor ascended to the throne and continued to use; the era was changed to Taichang in the following year. However, the Taichang Emperor died on 26 September (1st day of the 9th month) and reigned for only 30 days. On 1 October (6th day of the 9th month), after the Tianqi Emperor ascended to the throne, he issued an edict on 25 October (20th day of the 9th month) to change "the 8th month of the 48th year of the Wanli era" to "the first year of the Taichang era", and the era was changed to Tianqi in the following year.

Births
 1578 (Wanli 6) – Shen Defu, writer (d. 1642)
 1584 (Wanli 12) – Hu Zhengyan, engraver (d. 1674)
 August 1582 (Wanli 10, 8th month) – Zhu Changluo, the Taichang Emperor (d. 1620)
 February 1586 (Wanli 14, 1st month) – Zhu Changxun, Prince of Fu (d. 1641)
 November 1592 (Wanli 20, 10th month) – Hong Taiji, Emperor Taizong of Qing (d. 1643)
 December 1605 (Wanli 33, 11th month) – Zhu Youjiao, the Tianqi Emperor (d. 1627)
 April 1608 (Wanli 36, 3rd month) – Jin Shengtan, literary critic (d. 1661)
 February 1611 (Wanli 39, 1st month) – Zhu Youjian, the Chongzhen Emperor (d. 1644)
 1627 (Wanli 45) – Zhu Yongchun (朱用純), educator (d. 1698)

Deaths

 1582 (Wanli 10) – Zhang Juzheng, politician (b. 1535)
 1587 (Wanli 15) – Hai Rui, politician (b. 1514)
 1587 (Wanli 15) – Qi Jiguang, general (b. 1528)
 1593 (Wanli 21) – Li Shizhen, medical scientist (b. 1518)
 1594 (Wanli 22) – Liang Chenyu (梁辰魚), playwright (b. 1519)
 1605 (Wanli 33) – Tian Yi, eunuch (b. 1534)
 1606 (Wanli 34) – Yuan Huang (袁黃), thinker, author of "Liao-Fan's Four Lessons" (b. 1533)
 1616 (Wanli 44) – Tang Xianzu, dramatist (b. 1550)

Comparison table

Other regime era names that existed during the same period
 China
 Tianming (天命, 1616–1626): Later Jin — era name of Nurhaci
 Hongwu (弘武, 1619): Ming period — era name of Li Xin (李新)
 Tianzhenhun (天真混, 1619): Ming period — era name of Li Wen (李文)
 Vietnam
 Gia Thái (嘉泰, 1573–1577): Later Lê dynasty — era name of Lê Thế Tông
 Quang Hưng (光興, 1578–1599): Later Lê dynasty — era name of Lê Thế Tông
 Thận Đức (慎德, 1600): Later Lê dynasty — era name of Lê Kính Tông
 Hoằng Định (弘定, 1600–1619): Later Lê dynasty — era name of Lê Kính Tông
 Vĩnh Tộ (永祚, 1619–1629): Later Lê dynasty — era name of Lê Thần Tông
 Sùng Khang (崇康, 1568–1578): Mạc dynasty — era name of Mạc Mậu Hợp
 Diên Thành (延成, 1578–1585): Mạc dynasty — era name of Mạc Mậu Hợp
 Đoan Thái (端泰, 1585–1588): Mạc dynasty — era name of Mạc Mậu Hợp
 Hưng Trị (興治, 1588–1591): Mạc dynasty — era name of Mạc Mậu Hợp
 Hồng Ninh (洪寧, 1591–1592): Mạc dynasty — era name of Mạc Mậu Hợp
 Vũ An (武安, 1592): Mạc dynasty — era name of Mạc Toàn
 Bảo Định (寶定, 1592): Mạc dynasty — era name of Mạc Kính Chỉ
 Khang Hựu (康佑, 1593): Mạc dynasty — era name of Mạc Kính Chỉ
 Càn Thống (乾統, 1593–1625): Mạc dynasty — era name of Mạc Kính Cung
 Long Thái (隆泰, 1618–1625): Mạc dynasty — era name of Mạc Kính Khoan
 La Bình (羅平, 1594): Later Lê dynasty — era name of Vũ Đăng (武登)
 Phúc Đức (福德, 1596–1597): Later Lê dynasty — era name of Nguyễn Đương Minh (阮當明)
 Đại Đức (大德, 1595–1597): Later Lê dynasty — era name of Nguyễn Minh Trí (阮明智)
 Japan
 Genki (元亀, 1570–1573): era name of Emperor Ōgimachi
 Tenshō (天正, 1573–1592): era name of Emperor Ōgimachi and Emperor Go-Yōzei
 Bunroku (文禄, 1592–1596): era name of Emperor Go-Yōzei
 Keichō (慶長, 1596–1615): era name of Emperor Go-Yōzei and Emperor Go-Mizunoo
 Genna (元和, 1615–1624): era name of Emperor Go-Mizunoo

See also
 List of Chinese era names
 List of Ming dynasty era names

References

Further reading

Ming dynasty eras